Mario Watts (born May 21, 1975) is a retired professional sprinter and hurdler from Jamaica. He won a silver medal at the 2001 World Championships in Athletics by virtue of running for his team in the preliminary rounds. At those same championships he also competed in the 400 meter hurdles where he advanced to the semifinals but did not advance to the finals.

As a junior he won silver at the 1994 World Junior Championships in Athletics in the 4x400m, running in the final. He also won the 2001 Central American and Caribbean Championships in Athletics in the 400m hurdles, running 49.31 in the final.

As a youth he ran for Phillips Academy in Andover, Massachusetts. In 2003, he was named among the top ten athletes in Pennsylvania history.

Major international competitions

References 

Living people
1975 births
Jamaican male sprinters